is a Japanese former professional baseball first baseman who played for the Yomiuri Giants in Japan's Nippon Professional Baseball. He played with the Giants in 2008, 2009 and 2011.

External links

1988 births
Living people
People from Odawara
Baseball people from Kanagawa Prefecture
Japanese baseball players
Yomiuri Giants players